Alexandru Decebal Gego (born 12 December 1983) is a Romanian professional footballer who plays as a forward for Liga IV side Unirea Valea lui Mihai. In his career Gego also played for: FC Bihor Oradea, CSM Reșița, Unirea Alba Iulia, Olimpia Satu Mare and Gaz Metan Mediaș, among others.

References

External links
 
 
 Alexandru Gego at frf-ajf.ro

1983 births
Living people
Sportspeople from Oradea
Romanian footballers
Association football forwards
Liga I players
CS Gaz Metan Mediaș players
Liga II players
FC Bihor Oradea players
CSM Reșița players
CSM Unirea Alba Iulia players
FC Olimpia Satu Mare players
ASA 2013 Târgu Mureș players
CS Brănești players
FC Unirea Dej players